The Nissibi Euphrates Bridge is a cable-stayed bridge completed on May 21, 2015, spanning the Atatürk Reservoir on the Euphrates River at the provincial border of Adıyaman–Şanlıurfa in southeastern Turkey.

History
With the forming of the reservoir lake of Atatürk Dam in 1992, the bridge on the highway Kahta–Siverek–Diyarbakır crossing the Euphrates River was inundated. The traffic between Adıyaman and Diyarbakır had to be diverted in the south to the route   over Şanlıurfa. Traffic was maintained also by ferry boats across the lake. To bypass the detour, a new bridge was projected crossing over the Atatürk Reservoir.

Construction
The groundbreaking of the bridge was held in presence of Minister of Transport, Maritime and Communication Binali Yıldırım on January 26, 2012. The bridge is built by Gülsan Construction Co. It is named after the ancient town Nissibi situated in the vicinity. The bridge will carry two lanes of traffic in each direction.

The cost of the construction is estimated to be 100 million.

The bridge was officially opened on May 21, 2015 by President Recep Tayyip Erdoğan.

References

Cable-stayed bridges
Road bridges in Turkey
Bridges over the Euphrates River
Buildings and structures in Adıyaman Province
Buildings and structures in Şanlıurfa Province
Bridges completed in 2015
Cable-stayed bridges in Turkey
2015 establishments in Turkey
Crossings of the Euphrates